Wolfram is a former mining town within the locality of Dimbulah in the Shire of Mareeba. in Queensland, Australia, now a ghost town.

Geography 
It was also known as Wolfram Camp. It is at an altitude of approximately 538 metres.

History 
The mineral wolfram (from which the town derives its name) was discovered in the area in 1891 and attracted miners from neighbouring mining regions such as Thornborough and the Palmer River, forming a settlement known initially as Wolfram Camp.

Wolfram today 
Today there are few visible remains of the settlement. There are some concrete foundations of long-gone buildings, headstones in the cemetery, and a row of mango trees that mark where the school used to be.

Heritage listings 
Wolfram has a number of sites listed on the Queensland Heritage Register including:
 Main Street: La Société Française des Métaux Rares treatment plant
 Wolfram Road: Thermo Electric Ore Reduction Corporation Mill

Notable people 
 Bunny Adair, Member of the Queensland Legislative Assembly for Cook was born in Wolfram

References

External links 
 

 
Ghost towns in Queensland
Geography of Far North Queensland